Mirandilla is a municipality located in Badajoz Province, Extremadura, Spain. According to the 2005 census (INE), the municipality has a population of 1358 inhabitants.

References

Municipalities in the Province of Badajoz